Hermann Müller (18 April 1885 in Berlin – January 21, 1947 in Berlin) was a German athlete, who won the silver medal in the 3000 metre walk at the 1906 Intercalated Games held in Athens, Greece.

1885 births
1947 deaths
German male racewalkers
Olympic athletes of Germany
Olympic silver medalists for Germany
Medalists at the 1906 Intercalated Games
Athletes (track and field) at the 1906 Intercalated Games
Athletes from Berlin
World record setters in athletics (track and field)